Anders Dahl-Nielsen (born 27 January 1951) is a former Danish handball player who competed in the 1976 Summer Olympics, in the 1980 Summer Olympics, and in the 1984 Summer Olympics.

He was born in Aarhus.

In 1976 he was part of the Danish team which finished eighth in the Olympic tournament. He played all six matches and scored 22 goals.

Four years later he finished ninth with the Danish team in the 1980 Olympic tournament. He played all six matches and scored twenty goals.

In 1984 he was a member of the Danish team which finished fourth in the Olympic tournament. He played all six matches and scored eight goals.

External links
 profile

1951 births
Living people
Danish male handball players
Olympic handball players of Denmark
Handball players at the 1976 Summer Olympics
Handball players at the 1980 Summer Olympics
Handball players at the 1984 Summer Olympics
Sportspeople from Aarhus